Maradash (also spelled Mirdash)  is a Syrian village located in Shathah Subdistrict in Al-Suqaylabiyah District, Hama.  According to the Syria Central Bureau of Statistics (CBS), Maradesh had a population of 1899 in the 2004 census. It had a population of 600 in the early 1960s. Its inhabitants are predominantly Alawites.

References

Bibliography

Populated places in al-Suqaylabiyah District
Alawite communities in Syria